Chromodoridoidea are a taxonomic superfamily of shell-less sea slugs, marine gastropod mollusks included in the clade Nudibranchia.

Families
 Actinocyclidae O'Donoghue, 1929
 Cadlinellidae Odhner, 1934
 Cadlinidae Bergh, 1891
 Ceratosomatidae Gray, 1857 accepted as Miamirinae Bergh, 1891 (Under Art. 23.9, declared nomen oblitum by Bouchet & Rocroi, 2005)
 Chromodorididae Bergh, 1891
 Echinochilidae Odhner, 1968 accepted as Cadlinidae Bergh, 1891
 Glossodorididae O'Donoghue, 1924 accepted as Chromodoridinae Bergh, 1891
 Hexabranchidae Bergh, 1891
 Showajidaiidae Korshunova, Fletcher, Picton, Lundin, Kashio, N. Sanamyan, K. Sanamyan, Padula, Schrödl & Martynov, 2020

Subfamilies
 Cadlinellinae Odhner, 1934 accepted as Cadlinellidae Odhner, 1934 (original rank)
 Doriprismaticinae H. Adams & A. Adams, 1858 accepted as Chromodoridinae Bergh, 1891 (Under Art. 23.9, declared nomen oblitum by Bouchet & Rocroi, 2005)
 Inudinae Er. Marcus & Ev. Marcus, 1967 accepted as Cadlinidae Bergh, 1891
 Lissodoridinae Odhner, 1968 accepted as Chromodoridinae Bergh, 1891
 Thorunninae Odhner, 1926 accepted as Chromodoridinae Bergh, 1891

References

Nudipleura
Nudibranchia
Gastropod superfamilies